Centennial Park Cemetery is a large, 40.5 hectare (or 100 acre) cemetery in the southern Adelaide suburb of Pasadena, located on Goodwood Road. It is the largest cemetery in the southern suburbs and one of the largest in the Adelaide metropolitan area. It is jointly owned by the local government areas of the City of Mitcham and the City of Unley, with a Board of Management that includes two serving councillors from each council.

History
The cemetery was opened in June 1936, during South Australia's centennial year, although the first burial was not until 1938, when there were only ten in that year.
 
The cemetery contains a war graves plot known locally as Adelaide War Cemetery (marked on the plan as War Graves Plots), established by the Australian Army in 1942, holding the graves of 215 Commonwealth service personnel of World War II, primarily from local hospitals. Most of the graves are either side of the central path from the Goodwood Road entrance. In 1946 the Commonwealth War Graves Commission took over the plot and erected a Cross of Sacrifice, the first erected by the commission in the Southern Hemisphere. Near the cross is the South Australia Cremation Memorial to nine Australian service personnel who were cremated during the same war in the state of South Australia.

In 1955, the W.A. Norman Chapel was opened and included one of the state's first crematoria (the first was opened at West Terrace Cemetery in the 1903).  Since that time, the various crematoria have been upgraded and in 1983, three new cremators were constructed and considered a highly modern design at that time.

Notable interments or cremations
 Mahomet Allum, herbalist and healer, originally one of the Afghan cameleers in Australia
 Sir Donald Bradman, Australian Cricket Captain
 Thomas Caldwell, World War I Victoria Cross recipient
 Cyril Chambers, South Australian federal MP
 Percy Correll, member of the Australasian Antarctic Expedition
 LT Thomas Currie "Diver" Derrick, World War II Victoria Cross recipient (cenotaph)
 Dr. George Duncan, Lecturer at Adelaide University whose murder precipitated homosexual law reform in South Australia
 Richard Kelvin, son of Rob Kelvin
 Raymond Leane, Australian army officer and Police Commissioner
 Robert Richards, 32nd Premier of South Australia
 Hermann Sasse, Lutheran theologian and author
 James Cyril Stobie, design engineer and inventor of the Stobie pole
 Crawford Vaughan, 27th Premier of South Australia
 Frank Walsh, 34th Premier of South Australia
 Mary Alice Ward, teacher and pastoralist
 Myrtle Rose White, author

References

External links
 Centennial Park Cemetery

Cemeteries in South Australia
1936 establishments in Australia
Commonwealth War Graves Commission cemeteries in Australia